Anthony Smee (22 November 1949), known professionally as Tony Smee, is an English theatre producer, writer, and actor who has worked in radio, theatre, television, and film since 1972.

Background

Education
Smee trained at the Rose Bruford College.

Career

Theatre
Mr Maugham at Home (2010–2014)

Partial filmography
Return of the Jedi (1983) - Imperial Bunker Commander (uncredited)
Amongst Barbarians (1990) - johnny Depp
The English Patient (1996) - Beach Interrogation Officer
Hilary and Jackie (1998) - BBC Nabob
Parting Shots  (1998) - George
You're the Stranger Here (2009) - Bruno

Partial television

Colditz (1974) - Captain Able
Z-Cars (1977) - Mick
Secret Army (1977) - Vidler
Crown Court (1978) - Ben Hare
House of Caradus (7 episodes, 1979) - Lionel Caradus
Coronation Street (1981) - John Ridley
Wet Job (1981) - Thorne
Miss Marple "The Body in the Library"  (1984) - Basil Blake
Hold the Back Page (1985) - The Brigadier
Brookside (6 episodes, 1982–1986) - Keith Tench
Inspector Morse The Silent World of Nicholas Quinn (1987) - Roope
Home to Roost (1987) 
The Black and Blue Lamp (1988) 
Testimony of a Child (1989) 
Brass (11 episodes, 1984–1990) - Guy Baggers
Bergerac (1991) - Gerald Wenslow
Love Hurts (1992) - Businessman
Framed (2 episodes, 1992) - Superintendent
To Play the King (2 episodes, 1993) - John Staines
Nice Day at the Office (1994) - Robert Hutchinson
Crusades (1995) - Urban II
Sardines  (1995) - Tench
Backup (1995) - DCI Milne
Alas Smith and Jones (1 episode, 1997)
Kavanagh QC (1998) - Brown QC
Wycliffe (1998) - Rupert
A Touch of Frost (1999) 
Bugs (1999) - Chichester
The Alchemists (1999) - Anaesthetist
Heartbeat (2000) - Rod Dundas
Dirty Tricks (2000) - Defence Counsel
Bertie and Elizabeth  (2002)  - Ernest Simpson
The Bill (4 episodes, 1999–2002) - Richard Casson / Ken Watts / David Bryce
Lucky Jim (2003) - Mr. Pringle
Hollyoaks (2003) - Mr. Cornwell
Midsomer Murders (2005) - Captain Tucker
Strictly Confidential (2006) - Stefan
Half-Broken Things (2007) - Magistrate
Doctors (2008-2011) - Len Hardwick / David Rothering
Micro Men (2009) - Norman Hewett
The Queen (2009) - Robin Janvrin

Partial radio
The Archers (1972–1973)
BBC Drama Repertory Company (1974–1975)
BBC Radio, A Little Night Exposure (Radio 4 series, 1980–1981)

Recognition
Of Smee's 1992 performance in Thirteenth Night, Sabine Durrant of The Independent wrote "Anthony Smee, one part David Owen to two parts Edward Fox – delivers some masterfully refined paranoia".

Of Smee's 2010 role as Somerset Maugham in 'Mr Maugham at Home' at The New End Theatre, Clive Davis of The Times described his performance as superb.

Family
Smee is the biological father of Olympic dressage gold medallist Carl Hester.

References

External links

1949 births
Living people
Male actors from London
English theatre managers and producers
English male stage actors
People from Hackney Central
20th-century English male actors
21st-century English male actors
20th-century English writers
21st-century English writers